Zanthoxylum rhetsa, commonly known as Indian prickly ash, is a species of flowering plant in the family Rutaceae and occurs from India east to the Philippines and south to northern Australia. It is a deciduous shrub or tree with cone-shaped spines on the stems, pinnate leaves with between nine and twenty-three leaflets, panicles of white or yellowish, male and female flowers, followed by spherical red, brown or black follicles.

Description
The plant is sometimes deciduous and has stems with thick, cone-shaped spines on the older stems.

Taxonomy
Indian prickly ash was first formally described in 1820 by William Roxburgh who gave it the name Fagara rhetsa in his book, Flora Indica. In 1824, de Candolle changed the name to Zanthoxylum rhetsa in his book Prodromus Systematis Naturalis Regni Vegetabilis.

Distribution and habitat
It occurs in the northern Kimberley in Western Australia, the northern coastal areas of the Northern Territory, Cape York Peninsula in Queensland and on Gabba and Moa Islands in the Torres Strait.

Uses
The people of Goa, the Konkan and Kanara coasts, and Coorg use the woody pericarp of the tiny fruits as a spice, particularly with seafood dishes. The  spice is known as "triphal" in Marathi and "teppal" in Konkani - both words referring to the three lobes of the pericarp. The spice contains a chemical ingredient, sanshool, a local anesthetic that causes a tingling sensation on the tongue. Sanshool is also the main principle of Sichuan Pepper, which comes from the related species Zanthoxylum bungeanum and the Japanese/Korean pepper Zanthoxylum piperitum. Many butterflies, including Papilio buddha and Papilio helenus, use this as a host plant.

See also
 Sichuan pepper

References

rhetsa
Medicinal plants
Plants described in 1814
Taxa named by William Roxburgh
Flora of Queensland
Rosids of Western Australia
Flora of tropical Asia